is a district in Shibuya, Tokyo, Japan.

Ura-Harajuku, or Ura-Hara, is the common name given to the network of smaller Harajuku backstreets spreading perpendicular to Omotesando, corresponding on official maps of Shibuya ward as Jingūmae 3 chōme and 4 chōme. 

Ura-Harajuku contrasts with the main vehicle thoroughfares and retail offerings of Harajuku being mostly pedestrianized and showcasing smaller independent shops and dining options. Cat Street, following the course of the main Shibuya River tributary, is the principal route through this district spreading from Sendagaya in the north towards Shibuya in the south.

See also
Japanese street fashion
Hiroshi Fujiwara
Jun Takahashi
A Bathing Ape
Visvim

References

External links

 Ura-Hara shop guide (Japanese language)
 
 Harajuku photos and guide

Neighborhoods of Tokyo
Shibuya
Harajuku
Shopping districts and streets in Japan